ATWU may stand for:

 Amalgamated Textile Workers' Union, in the UK
 Australian Textile Workers' Union